Judson Clarke (born 17 October 2003) is a professional Australian rules footballer playing for the Richmond Football Club in the Australian Football League (AFL). Clarke was drafted by Richmond with the thirtieth pick in the 2021 AFL Draft, and made his AFL debut in Round 13 of the 2022 season.

Early life and junior football
Clarke grew up playing for the East Ringwood Football Club through his junior career. Clarke suffered an ACL injury late in the 2019 season and did rehab through 2020 when the was no NAB League Boys season due to Covid. He played for the Dandenong Stingrays in the NAB League and also played school football at Yarra Valley Grammar. Clarke also played for Vic Country where he kicked 5 goals against Vic Metro in a trial match in June 2021.

AFL career

2022 season
After a promising stint in the VFL, including a four goal game against Footscray, Clarke was selected and made his debut in Round 13 of the 2022 season against Port Adelaide where he kicked two goals and recorded eleven disposals. He became the 31st player in AFL history to kick goals with his first two kicks.

Statistics
Updated to the end of round 23, 2022.

|-
| 2022
|  || 42 || 3 || 3 || 1 || 16 || 9 || 25 || 9 || 4 || 1.0 || 0.3 || 5.3 || 3.0 || 8.3 || 3.0 || 1.3
|- class="sortbottom" 
! colspan=3| Career
! 3
! 3
! 1
! 16
! 9
! 25
! 9
! 4
! 1.0
! 0.3
! 5.3
! 3.0
! 8.3
! 3.0
! 1.3
|}

References

External links

2003 births
Living people
Australian rules footballers from Victoria (Australia)
Richmond Football Club players
Dandenong Stingrays players